The 2023 NC State Wolfpack football team will represent North Carolina State University during the 2023 NCAA Division I FBS football season. The Wolfpack will play their home games at Carter–Finley Stadium in Raleigh, North Carolina, and compete as members of the Atlantic Coast Conference. They will be led by head coach Dave Doeren, in his 11th season.

Previous season
The Wolfpack finished the 2022 season 8–5, 4–4 in ACC play to finish tied for third place in the Atlantic Division. They received an invitation to the 2022 Duke's Mayo Bowl where they were lost 12–16 to Maryland.

Schedule
NC State announced its 2023 football schedule on January 30, 2023. The 2023 season is the first that the Atlantic Coast Conference eliminated divisions, and thus the Wolfpack will face conference opponents on a rotational pod basis. The 2023 schedule consists of seven home games and five away games in the regular season. The Wolfpack will host ACC foes Clemson, Louisville, Miami and North Carolina and will travel to Duke, Virginia, Virginia Tech, and Wake Forest.

The Wolfpack will host three of the four non-conference opponents, Marshall from the Sun Belt Conference, Notre Dame from FBS Independents, and VMI from Division I FCS, and will travel to UConn from FBS Independents.

Game summaries

at UConn

Notre Dame

VMI

at Virginia

Louisville

Marshall

at Duke

Clemson

Miami

at Wake Forest

at Virginia Tech

North Carolina

Rankings

References

NC State
NC State Wolfpack football seasons
2023 in sports in North Carolina